Jill Escher is a former attorney and real estate developer.  She is the head of the Escher Fund for Autism, the immediate past president of the Autism Society of America San Francisco Bay Area chapter, and the president of the National Council on Severe Autism.  Escher is a graduate of Stanford University and the UC Berkeley School of Law.

Research
Escher hypothesizes that the increasing prevalence and strong heritability of autism can in part be explained by non-genetic, environmentally informed events. In particular, her work stresses that heritable components of parental germ cells (egg and sperm and especially their precursors) can be damaged by exogenous toxicants such as tobacco smoke, general anesthesia, and synthetic steroid drugs, dysregulating brain-related gene expression in the offspring. The changes can manifest as changes in chromatin, epigenome, or de novo mutations. The Escher Fund for Autism awards grants each year to scientists undertaking pilot projects related to germ cell exposure to toxicants. Some scientists claim that she should also look into other causes of autism.

Escher's hypothesis is based on her own personal story.  When her mother was pregnant with her in 1965, she was administered very high, regular doses of synthetic steroid hormone drugs that were thought at the time to prevent miscarriage. After discovering this history at age 45, Escher hypothesized that these drugs disrupted the development of her fetal eggs, which ultimately caused two of her children to have autism.  She is known for collaborating with scientific experts, speaking at scientific conferences, and for being elected as the only non-scientist to serve on the governing council of the Environmental Mutagenesis and Genomics Society.  Escher has also petitioned the FDA to withdraw approval for two drugs until they can be tested for impacts on developing fetal germ cells, an anti-nausea drug approved for pregnant women, and the synthetic progestin marketed as Makena.  Her papers published in scientific journals stress that more research needs to be done on germ line vulnerabilities to pharmaceuticals and chemicals.

In 2013, Escher presented at the Interagency Autism Coordinating Committee about the germ cell exposure hypothesis of autism.  In 2019, she was invited to present at the National Institute of Environmental Health Sciences about the importance of research on germline exposures.

In 2021, Escher, along with Wei Yan, Victor Corces, and others  published an article in the Journal of Autism and Developmental Disorders calling for more research into germline exposures as a potential cause of autism.

Advocacy

Before becoming a research advocate, Escher earned her J.D. degree and Master's in City and Regional Planning at UC Berkeley.  In 1996, Jill Escher published her master's thesis, A Nightmare on Elm Street?: Government Liability for Innovative Street Design.

Concerned about sugar's effects on the public health, Escher founded Sugar Addiction Awareness Day in 2011, which promotes the claim that sugar addiction among many people is a legitimate issue.  She believes that some people are biologically susceptible to this addiction, and should eliminate sugar and flour from their diet.  She has written articles on this topic, and has advocated for awareness in general.

In 2002, Escher appealed to the Blue Cross Blue Shield Federal Employee Program to provide reimbursement for speech-language services for all autistic individuals, claiming that speech therapy provides benefits to autistic individuals that are equivalent to medicine.  Escher won her appeal but also asked the Office of Personnel Management for a written decision indicating that BCBS was an error.  This was cited as an example of a reimbursement appeal success.

Escher founded the National Council on Severe Autism.  Escher claims that the problem with the neurodiversity paradigm is that proponents of this view focus far too much on the positives of autism, and not on the difficulties. She claims that many ND advocates bully and terrorize people into silence.

The Autism Society of America's national headquarters responded to two blog pieces written by Jill Escher.  Escher wrote that she was worried that the government would prevent the creation of new residences and programs for autistic people, and the ASA said that they were optimistic that the government would do what is best.  In response to a book review criticizing Neurotribes by Steve Silberman, where she claims that Silberman ignores the effects of severe autism, the ASA said that they respect the views of Silberman.  Escher responded by claiming that the government needs a better plan for housing for autistic people, and that the ASA should explain why they support Steve Silberman's work.

Bibliography

References

External links

Germline Exposures

1965 births
21st-century American writers
Living people
American women lawyers
American lawyers
California lawyers
Stanford University alumni
UC Berkeley School of Law alumni
21st-century American women